Cycling Team Friuli ASD (UCI code: CTF) is an Italian cycling team founded in 2005, that has been registered as a UCI Continental team since 2019. The team also owns a UCI professional team track Licence which allows it to participate to World Cup races.

Team roster

Major results
2019
Popolarissima, Nicola Venchiarutti
Trofeo Edil C, Giovanni Aleotti
2020
Stage 5 Giro Ciclistico d'Italia, Jonathan Milan
2022
GP Vipava Valley & Crossborder Goriška, Fran Miholjević
Stage 3 Giro di Sicilia, Fran Miholjević
 1st  Overall Carpathian Couriers Race, Fran Miholjević
1st  Points classification
1st  Young rider classification
Prologue, Nicolò Buratti
Stage 1, Fran Miholjević
 National Time Trial Championships, Fran Miholjević
Gran Premio di Poggiana, Nicolò Buratti
GP Capodarco, Nicolò Buratti
Stage 4 Giro della Regione Friuli Venezia Giulia, Nicolò Buratti

National champions
2021
 Croatia U23 Time Trial, Fran Miholjević
2022
 Croatia Time Trial, Fran Miholjević

References

External links

UCI Continental Teams (Europe)
Cycling teams based in Italy
Cycling teams established in 2005